The Alexamenos graffito (also known as the graffito blasfemo, or blasphemous graffito) is a piece of Roman graffito scratched in plaster on the wall of a room near the Palatine Hill in Rome, Italy, which has now been removed and is in the Palatine Museum. It may be meant to depict Jesus; if so, it competes with an engraved gem held in the British Museum as the earliest known pictorial representation of the Crucifixion of Jesus. It is hard to date, but has been estimated to have been made at around the year 200. The image seems to show a young man worshipping a crucified, donkey-headed figure. The Greek inscription approximately translates to "Alexamenos worships [his] god," indicating that the graffito was apparently meant to mock a Christian named Alexamenos.

Content 

The image depicts a human-like figure affixed to a cross and possessing the head of a donkey or mule. In the top right of the image is what has been interpreted as either the Greek letter upsilon or a tau cross. To the left of the image is a young manapparently intended to represent Alexamenosas a Roman soldier or guard, raising one hand in a gesture possibly suggesting worship. The name Alexamenos (and its Latinate variant Alexamenus) is also attested in the instances of Alexamenus of Teos, student of Socrates, and the general,
Or, it may just be derived from Greek ἀλεξάμενος (alexamenos), which is the participle of the Greek verb ἀλέξω (alexo) meaning "to defend" as well as "to help" Beneath the cross is a caption written in crude , ALE XAMENOS SEBETE THEON. ϹΕΒΕΤΕ can be understood as a variant spelling (possibly a phonetic misspelling) of Standard Greek ϹΕΒΕΤΑΙ, which means "worships". The full inscription would then be read as Ᾰλεξᾰ́μενος σέβεται θεόν, "Alexamenos worships [his] God". Several other sources suggest "Alexamenos worshiping a god", or similar variants, as the intended translation. In the next chamber, another inscription in a different hand reads  (Alexamenos ), Latin for "Alexamenos is faithful" or "Alexamenos the faithful". This may be a retort by an unknown party to the mockery of Alexamenos represented in the graffito.

Date 
No clear consensus has been reached on when the image was made. Dates ranging from the late 1st to the late 3rd century have been suggested, with the beginning of the 3rd century thought to be the most likely.

Discovery and location 
The graffito was discovered in 1857 when a building called the domus Gelotiana was unearthed on the Palatine Hill. The emperor Caligula had acquired the house for the imperial palace, which, after Caligula died, became used as a Paedagogium (boarding school) for imperial page boys. Later, the street on which the house sat was walled off to give support to extensions to the buildings above, and it thus remained sealed for centuries.

Interpretation 
The inscription is usually taken to be a mocking depiction of a Christian in the act of worship. At the time, pagans derided Christians for worshipping a man who had been crucified. The donkey's head and crucifixion would both have been considered insulting depictions by contemporary Roman society. Crucifixion continued to be used as an execution method for the worst criminals until its abolition by the emperor Constantine in the 4th century, and the impact of seeing a figure on a cross is comparable to the impact today of portraying a man with a hangman's noose around his neck or seated in an electric chair.

It seems to have been commonly believed at the time that Christians practiced onolatry (donkey-worship). That was based on the misconception that Jews worshipped a god in the form of a donkey, a claim made by Apion (30-20 BC – c. AD 45-48) and denied by Josephus in his aptly-titled work Against Apion.

Origen reports in his treatise Contra Celsum that the pagan philosopher Celsus made the same claim against Christians and Jews.

Tertullian, writing in the late 2nd or early 3rd century, reports that Christians, along with Jews, were accused of worshipping such a deity. He also mentions an apostate Jew who carried around Carthage a caricature of a Christian with ass's ears and hooves, labeled Deus Christianorum  ("The God of the Christians conceived of an ass.").

It has also been suggested that both the graffito and the roughly contemporary gems with Crucifixion images are related to heretical groups outside the Church.

In the image, Alexamenos is portrayed venerating an image of the crucifix, a detail that Peter Maser believed to represent actual Christian practice of veneration of icons. This practice, however, was not known to be a part of Christian worship until the 4th or 5th century.

Notes

References

Sources 
 Schiller, Gertrud. Iconography of Christian Art, Vol. II, 1972 (English trans from German), Lund Humphries, London,

Further reading 
 Titus Flavius Josephus, Against Apion, II (VII), 2.80
 Norman Walker, The Riddle of the Ass's Head, and the question of a trigram, ZAW 9 (1963), 219–231.

External links 

 The Alexamenos Graffito: page by Rodney J. Decker
 Alexamenos and pagan perceptions of Christians
 Alexamenos: a Christian mocked for believing in a crucified God

3rd century in art
3rd century in the Roman Empire
3rd-century inscriptions
1857 archaeological discoveries
Ancient city of Rome
Anti-Christian sentiment in Europe
Archaeological discoveries in Italy
Arts in Rome
Christianity in the Roman Empire
Christianity in Rome
Crucifixion of Jesus in art
Donkeys in art
Early Christianity-related inscriptions
Graffiti (archaeology)
Palatine Hill
Roman Empire art
Roman-era Greek inscriptions